John Greenway may refer to:
John Greenway (MP), former British MP
John Greenway (diplomat), British diplomat
John Greenway (folklorist) (1919–1991)
John Campbell Greenway (1872–1926), American mining, steel and railroad executive
John Wesley Greenway (1861–1928), Canadian civil servant and politician
John Greenway (died 1529), merchant of Tiverton, Devon